The 388th Fighter Wing (388FW) is a United States Air Force unit assigned to the Air Combat Command Fifteenth Air Force. The unit is stationed at Hill Air Force Base, Utah.

Units
388th Operations Group (388 OG)
4th Fighter Squadron (4 FS)
  The squadron is the second unit at Hill to transition to the Lockheed Martin F-35 Lightning II after retiring the F-16 in May 2016. It prepares to deploy worldwide to conduct air-to-air and air-to-ground operations for daylight and nighttime missions.

421st Fighter Squadron (421 FS)
 The squadron conducts flying operations to maintain combat readiness of a 24-aircraft F-16CG squadron. It prepares to deploy worldwide to conduct Day/Night air superiority and precision strike sorties employing laser-guided and inertially aided munitions during contingencies and combat.

 34th Fighter Squadron
 This squadron is the first operational F-35A Lightning II fighter squadron in the world. It was declared combat-ready on 2 August 2016 after transitioning from the F-16 Fighting Falcon in September of the previous year.
388th Range Squadron (388 RANS)
 The squadron is responsible for weapons and tactics development, operational planning, flying training guidance, intelligence, flight scheduling, mobility, life support activities, and people management for the operations group. The OSS provides combat-related staff support for the entire wing.

 388th Operations Support Squadron (388 OSS)
 The squadron is responsible for weapons and tactics development, operational planning, flying training guidance, intelligence, flight scheduling, mobility, life support activities, and people management for the operations group. The OSS provides combat-related staff support for the entire wing. It comprises the following flights: Intelligence; Aircrew Flight Equipment; Current Operations; and Weapons & Tactics.

388th Maintenance Group (388 MXG)
 The group comprises different support facets as squadrons and flights.  The Munition Maintenance Squadron has many flights, but is primarily responsible for munitions storage, maintenance and delivery.  The Munitions Loading Squadron takes responsibility for attaching the delivered munitions to the various aircraft.

History

On 23 November 1953, the 388th Fighter-Bomber Wing was activated as part of Tactical Air Command. The wing was reactivated following Secretary of State John Foster Dulles' promise to provide NATO with four additional tactical fighter wings to increase its defenses against the Soviet Union due to the outbreak of the Cold War. The 388th Fighter-Interceptor Wing activated as the 388th Fighter-Bomber Group (later renamed 388th Operations Group) and became the wing's primary combat element. The group's squadrons were equipped with North American F-86F Sabres, and training commenced for operational proficiency.

Once training levels for pilots and aircrews had reached operational levels, the 50th FBW began preparations for its move to France. On 12 December 1954, the 388th FBW arrived at its new home, the newly constructed Étain-Rouvres Air Base.

United States Air Forces in Europe

Upon arrival in France in December 1954, the 388th FBW flying elements consisted of the 561st, 562d, and 563d FB Squadrons, each equipped with 26 F-86F "Sabres".  Wing support aircraft consisted of 4 C-47s of various types, one DHC L-20A Beaver, and 5 T-33s.

The wing's mission was to train for and conduct tactical nuclear weapons delivery.   Its secondary mission was to conduct non-atomic tactical air operations. Upon arrival of 388th Wing Headquarters at Etain, the construction delays and other problems seriously hampered the ability of the Wing to use the base for its flying operations.  The 562nd Fighter Bomber Squadron was forced to operate from Spangdahlem Air Base, the 563rd from Bitburg Air Base and the 561st from Hahn Air Base in West Germany for the winter of 1954–55.

In April and May 1955, rotational deployments to Wheelus Air Base, Libya began for their first gunnery and bombing training since their arrival in Europe. In the fall, with enough facilities construction completed, the three flying squadrons were transferred from Germany and took up their home assignment at Étain. In August 1955, First Lt. Philip Ortego was assigned to the 561st Fighter Bomber Squadron as its Intelligence Officer.

On 22 November 1955, Det #1, 388th Fighter-Bomber Group was activated at Hahn Air Base to stand nuclear alert with the Wing's F-86s. Personnel and aircraft primarily came from the 561st FBS. In February 1956 the detachment was transferred to more spacious facilities at Spangdahlem Air Base. Rotational deployments of 8 F-86's and support personnel to Germany continued until the fall of 1957 when the 388th was inactivated.

In the fall of 1956 the 388th began planning for conversion to the F-100D/F "Super Sabre" Due to the adverse flying conditions at Etain for conversion training, the new aircraft were deployed to Nouasseur Air Base in Morocco, with the squadrons deploying their F-86's to Nouasseur, then returning to France or Spangdahlem in their new F-100s for Zulu Alert duties.

During this transition period, the 388th experienced a significant personnel crisis, with many of its officers and NCO's completing their two-year unaccompanied tour in France. The personnel problem became worse in the fall of 1957 with many single airmen completing their three years of overseas service and were rotating back to the United States (CONUS).

The manning issues of the 388th, which has fallen to about 65 percent of authorized strength, along with budget shortfalls led HQ USAFE to inactivate the unit instead of transfer it. On 8 December 1957 HQ USAFE inactivated the 388th FBW, with its and assets being redesignated as the 49th Fighter-Bomber Wing, which had been administratively reassigned from Misawa AB, Japan without personnel or equipment.

McConnell Air Force Base
In October 1962, the 388th Tactical Fighter Wing was reactivated under Tactical Air Command (TAC). The wing was reorganized at McConnell AFB, Kansas, under the Twelfth Air Force, as a tenant unit under the provisional 4347th Combat Training Wing.

Under TAC, the 388th did not have a fighter group, and the four Tactical Fighter Squadrons (560th, 561st, 562d, 563d) were assigned directly to Wing Headquarters. The reactivated wing initially flew the North American F-100C Super Sabre, but was replaced in 1963 by the Republic F-105D/F Thunderchief. On 4 July 1963, it became responsible for the base as the host unit.

The demands of the Vietnam War and escalation of United States involvement in the conflict led TAC to deploy the 388th to Southeast Asia for combat duty. New bases were being established in Thailand, and a permanent organizational structure was needed to accommodate the semi-permanent presence of USAF units at the forward bases.  On 8 April 1966, the 388th TFW was relieved of its assignment to Tactical Air Command and was transferred to Pacific Air Forces.   The wing was ordered to Korat Royal Thai Air Force Base, Thailand, where its F-105 squadrons had been on temporary rotational deployments for the past two years.

Pacific Air Forces

In April 1966 the 388th was sent to Korat Royal Thai Air Force Base, Thailand where it replaced the provisional 6234th Tactical Fighter Wing and assumed host wing responsibilities at Korat. The mission of the wing was to engage in combat operations over Indochina, conducting interdiction, direct air support, armed reconnaissance, and fighter escort missions.
During the Vietnam War, numerous units were deployed to and stationed at Korat RTAFB and engaged in combat operations. As part of the rapid buildup of United States forces in Thailand in the mid-1960s, the 388th was the umbrella organization to as many as 34 operating units and about 6,500 USAF airmen. The wing also supported components of the Royal Thai Air Force, and a complement of Royal New Zealand Air Force (RNZAF) Bristol Freighters.

The squadrons assigned to the 388th TFW at Korat were:
 3d Tactical Fighter Squadron (Tail Code: JH)
 A-7D Corsair II, March 1973 – December 1975

 7th Airborne Command and Control Squadron (Tail Code: JC)
 EC-130E Hercules, April 1972 – May 1974

 6010th Wild Weasel Squadron: 1 November 1970 (Tail Code: JB)
 Redesignated: 17th Wild Weasel Squadron: 1 December 1971 – 15 November 1974
 F-105G Thunderchief, November 1970 – December 1974

 34th Tactical Fighter Squadron (Tail Code: JJ)
 F-105D/F Thunderchief, May 1966 – May 1969
 F-4E Phantom II, May 1969 – October 1974
 F-4D Phantom II, October 1974 – December 1975

 42d Tactical Electronic Warfare Squadron (Tail Code: JV)
 EB-66C/E Destroyer, September 1970 – January 1974

 44th Tactical Fighter Squadron (Tail Code: JE)
 F-105D/F Thunderchief, April 1967 – November 1970
 F-4E Phantom II, December 1970 – December 1975

 469th Tactical Fighter Squadron (Tail Code: JV)
 F-105D/F Thunderchief, August 1966 – November 1969
 F-4E Phantom II, November 1969 – October 1972

 553d Reconnaissance Squadron (no tail code)
 EC-121R Constellation, December 1970 – December 1971

 Detachment 1, 561st Tactical Fighter Squadron (Tail Code: WW)
 F-105G Thunderchief, February 1973 – September 1973

In mid-1968 it was decided to make the 388th an F-4 Wing, and also to equip the 388th with the new F-4E and the F-105s would be transferred to the 355th TFW at Takhli RTAFB. The main difference with the F-4E model was the addition of an internal M61 cannon. The F-4C and D models previously in use had shown some serious drawbacks in the initial air-to-air battles over Vietnam. The earlier Sparrow, Falcon, and Sidewinder air-to-air missiles did not perform up to expectations. They were expensive, unreliable, and vulnerable to countermeasures. The Phantoms could carry a podded cannon mounted on the centerline, but it was relatively inaccurate, caused excessive drag which reduced the performance of the Phantom carrying it, and took up a valuable ordnance/fuel station.

On 17 November 1968, an F-4E Phantom squadron from Eglin AFB, FL, replaced the single-seat F-105E Thunderchiefs of the 469th TFS. The new Phantom squadron, the first E-models in Thailand, retained the designation 469th TFS.

In January 1969, the wing sought a new assignment. Proliferating antiaircraft defenses in the Barrel Roll area in the Kingdom of Laos were making operations ever riskier for Slow FACs such as the Raven FACs. Volunteers from the 469th Tactical Fighter Squadron were approved for Fast FAC duty under the call sign "Tiger" in February. On 18 March, the volunteer FACs began flying a single daily sortie. By July, they were so immersed in directing close air support, they were allotted four sorties per day. They supplied the necessary tactical air power for General Vang Pao's Hmong guerrillas to sweep through Operation Raindance. Among the benefits of strike and FAC units being co-located was the Hunter-Killer Team concept fostered by "Tiger" FACs. Strike aircraft could be directed by FACs, or the flight leader could take over the air strike after being led to the target.

On 10 May 1969, the 34th Tactical Fighter Squadron was transferred organizationally to the 347th TFW at Yokota AB, Japan, but it remained attached to the 388th TFW at Korat. It was re-equipped with F-4Es on 5 July. On 15 May 1969, the F-105-equipped 44th Tactical Fighter Squadron was transferred and reassigned to the 355th TFW .

On 12 June 1972, the 35th Tactical Fighter Squadron flying F-4D's was deployed from the 3rd TFW, Kusan AB, South Korea, in a "Constant Guard" redeployment to support operations over North Vietnam during Linebacker. They remained until 10 October 1972 when they returned to Korea.

On 29 September 1972, the 354th Tactical Fighter Wing, based at Myrtle Beach AFB SC, deployed 72 A-7D Corsair II of the 355th, 353rd and 354th Tactical Fighter Squadrons and the 356th Tactical Fighter Squadron to Korat for a 179-day Temporary Duty (TDY). By mid-October, 1,574 airmen from Myrtle Beach had arrived.  In March 1973 A-7D aircraft were drawn from the deployed 354th TFW squadrons and assigned to the 388th TFW as the 3d Tactical Fighter Squadron (Tail Code: JH). Some TDY personnel from the 354th TFW were assigned to the 388th and placed on permanent party status.

In April 1972 Det 1. 561st Tactical Fighter Squadron deployed from McConnell Air Force Base to Korat flying specially equipped F-105Gs. With the end of combat in August, the squadron returned to 35th TFW at George on 5 September.

After the end of combat operations in August 1973, the 388th TFW entered into intensive training program to maintain combat readiness and continued to fly electronic surveillance and intelligence missions. Also, it was announced by the United States and Thailand that of the 43,000 Americans and 500 aircraft stationed in Thailand, about 3,500 men and 100 aircraft would be withdrawn. The 388th entered into intensive training program to maintain combat readiness and continued to fly electronic surveillance and intelligence missions. The 388th provided air cover and escort during the evacuation of Americans from Phnom Penh, Cambodia, and of Americans and selected Vietnamese from Saigon, South Vietnam, in April 1975.

At the end of 1975, there were only three combat squadrons at Korat, consisting of 24 F-4D's of the 34th TFS, 24 A-7D's of the 3rd TFS, and 6 AC-130 "Spectre" aircraft of the 16th Special Operations Squadron.  On 23 December 1975, the 388th TFW and its remaining Squadron, inactivated at Korat RTAFB, closing out the USAF operations at the base.

For these operations and its wartime service at Korat Royal Thai Air Force Base (1966–1975), the wing earned a total of eight Air Force Outstanding Unit Awards and a Presidential Unit Citation.

Tactical Air Command

The 388th ceased all aircraft operations at Korat Thailand in November 1975 and moved in without personnel or equipment in December 1975 to Hill AFB, Utah, replacing a holding unit-Detachment 1, 67th Combat Support Group.  In January 1976, the wing began participation in training missions and numerous exercises in a variety of offensive tactical situations flying F-4D Phantom II tactical fighters.

The wing started its conversion to the F-16A Fighting Falcon on 23 January 1979, becoming the USAF first fully operational F-16 Fighter Wing. During initial stages of conversion the wing trained F-16 instructor pilots and provided replacement training for new F-16 pilots.  Thereafter the 388th trained for war readiness at U.S. and NATO locations.

In March 1981, the wing conducted its first overseas deployment to Fleslan AS, Norway. It won the USAF Worldwide Gunsmoke Fighter Gunnery Meet in 1987.  In May 1989, the first F-16C Block 40 aircraft arrived at Hill AFB, Utah. The new model F-16, designed to accommodate the Low Altitude Navigation and Targeting Infrared for Night (LANTIRN) pod, allowed targeting and bombing in adverse operational conditions.

The 388th TFW was the first unit to fly the F-16 into conflict with the Low Altitude Navigation and Targeting Infrared for Night (LANTIRN) system over the skies of Iraq and Kuwait during Operations DESERT SHIELD/DESERT STORM.  A number of wing aircraft initially deployed to Spain as attrition reserves from January–December 1991, with two squadrons to Southwest Asia for combat operations from 28 August 1990 – 27 March 1991.  After the March 1991 cease-fire, it remained in Southwest Asia to protect Coalition assets and ensure that Iraq complied with treaty terms beginning in December 1991.  The 388th FW continued to employ the LANTIRN-equipped aircraft in Operations DESERT CALM, DESERT FOX, and NORTHERN and SOUTHERN WATCH.

Twenty-first century

Since the September 11 terrorist attacks in 2001, the 4th, 34th, and 421st Fighter Squadrons and the 729th Air Control Squadron have actively engaged in the War in Afghanistan (2001–2021), Iraqi Freedom and the home defence Operation Noble Eagle, defending the nation at home and abroad. The wing continued to develop its role of Forward Air Control-Airborne. Assorted support personnel were deployed en masse or individually from within each unit of the 388 FW.

The 388 FW continued its dominance into the 21st century by avidly and diligently deploying its personnel on a continuous loop of AEF deployments, while taking on new roles with Forward Air Control – Airborne.

The 388th Range Squadron, coupled with the Utah Test and Training Range, have continued to provide test and training opportunities to the world's F-16 fleet through many local and off-base exercises, to include Air Warrior, Amalgam Thunder, Combat Archer, Cope Thunder, Exercise Iron Falcon, Maple Flag, Red Flag, and support for the Fighter Weapon Instructor Course (FWIC) and Tactical Air Control Parties (TACP).

On 22 June 2009 a single-seat F-16 from the wing's 421st Fighter Squadron on a training mission crashed in the Utah Test and Training Range.  The pilot, Captain George Bryan Houghton, 28, was killed.

On 2 September 2015, the first two Lockheed Martin F-35A Lightning II aircraft arrived at Hill AFB to begin the transition to the aircraft that is scheduled to finish in 2019.

Lineage
 Established as 388th Fighter-Day Wing on 23 March 1953
 Redesignated 388th Fighter-Bomber Wing on 5 November 1953
 Activated on 23 November 1953
 Inactivated on 10 December 1957
 Redesignated 388th Tactical Fighter Wing and activated, on 1 May 1962
 Organized on 1 October 1962
 Discontinued and inactivated on 8 February 1964
 Activated on 14 March 1966
 Organized on 8 April 1966
 Redesignated 388th Fighter Wing on 1 October 1991

Assignments
 Ninth Air Force, 23 November 1953
 Twelfth Air Force, 12 December 1954 – 10 December 1957
 Tactical Air Command, 1 May 1962
 Twelfth Air Force, 1 October 1962 – 8 February 1964
 Pacific Air Forces, 14 March 1966
 Thirteenth Air Force, 8 April 1966
 Attached to: Seventh Air Force, 8 April 1966 – 14 February 1973
 Attached to: US Support Activities Group, Seventh Air Force, 15 February 1973-c. 30 June 1975
 17th Air Division, 1 July 1975
 Twelfth Air Force, 23 December 1975–August 2020
 Fifteenth Air Force, 20 August 2020-onwards

Components
Groups
 388th Fighter-Bomber (later, 388th Operations) Group: 23 November 1953 – 10 December 1957; 1 December 1991–present.

Assigned Squadrons

 3d Tactical Fighter Squadron: 15 March 1973 – 15 December 1975
 4th Tactical Fighter (later, 4th Fighter) Squadron: 23 December 1975 – 1 December 1991 (detached 28 August 1990 – 27 March 1991)
 7th Airborne Command and Control Squadron: 30 April 1972 – 22 May 1974
 16th Tactical Fighter Training (later, 16th Tactical Fighter) Squadron: 1 January 1979 – 30 June 1986
 34th Tactical Fighter (later, 34th Fighter) Squadron: attached 15 May 1966 – 14 March 1971, assigned 15 March 1971 – 1 December 1991
 42d Tactical Electronic Warfare Squadron: attached c. 21 September – 14 October 1970, assigned 15 October 1970 – 15 March 1974
 44th Tactical Fighter Squadron: 25 April 1967 – 15 October 1969 (detached 10–15 October 1969)
 421st Tactical Fighter (later, 421st Fighter) Squadron: 8 April 1966 – 25 April 1967; 23 December 1975 – 1 December 1991 (detached 9–23 August 1977 and 28 August 1990 – 27 March 1991)
 469th Tactical Fighter Squadron: 8 April 1966 – 31 October 1972
 553d Reconnaissance Squadron: 15 December 1970 – 31 December 1971
 560th Tactical Fighter Squadron: 1 October 1962 – 8 February 1964
 561st Fighter-Bomber (later, 561st Tactical Fighter) Squadron: attached 1 July – 10 December 1957; assigned 1 October 1962 – 8 February 1964
 562d Fighter-Bomber (later, 562d Tactical Fighter) Squadron: attached 1 July – 10 December 1957; assigned 1 October 1962 – 8 February 1964
 563d Fighter-Bomber (later, 563d Tactical Fighter) Squadron: attached 1 July – 10 December 1957; assigned 1 October 1962 – 8 February 1964
 6010th Wild Weasel Squadron: 1 November 1970 – 1 December 1971
 17th Wild Weasel Squadron: 1 December 1971 – 15 November 1974
 729th Air Control Squadron: 1 October 1985 – 1 October 2007

Attached Squadrons

 13th Tactical Fighter Squadron: attached 15 May 1966 – 20 October 1967
 16th Special Operations Squadron: attached 19 July 1974 – 8 December 1975
 35th Tactical Fighter Squadron: attached c. 12 June-c. 10 October 1972

Stations
 Clovis Air Force Base, New Mexico, 23 November 1953 – 28 November 1954
 Étain-Rouvres Air Base, France, 12 December 1954 – 10 December 1957
 McConnell Air Force Base, Kansas, 1 October 1962 – 8 February 1964
 Korat Royal Thai Air Force Base, Thailand, 8 April 1966
 Hill Air Force Base, Utah, 23 December 1975 – present

Aircraft

 F-100 Super Sabre, 1957; 1962–1964
 F-105 Thunderchief, 1963–1964; 1966–1969; 1970–1974
 F-4 Phantom II, 1968–1975, 1976–1980
 EB-66 Destroyer, 1970–1974

 EC-121 Warning Star, 1970–1971
 AC/C-130 Hercules, 1972–1975
 A-7D Corsair II, 1973–1975
 F-16 Fighting Falcon, 1979–2017
 F-35 Lightning II, 2015–present

References

Notes

Bibliography

 
 
 
 
 Schlight, John (1969). ''Project CHECO Report: Jet Forward Air Controllers in SE Asia." Headquarters Pacific Air Force. ASIN B00ARRLMEY.

External links

 388 FW Home Page
 388th Bomb Group Database
 Official website of the 388th Bomb Group Association
 site about the 388th within 8th airforce

Military units and formations in Utah
388
1975 establishments in Utah